East Timor participated in the 2014 Asian Games in Incheon, South Korea from 19 September to 4 October 2014.

Athletics

Men's

Women

Beach volleyball

Men

Boxing

Men

Cycling

Men

Road

Mountain Bike

Football

Men

Karate

Men's kumite

Taekwondo

Women

References

Nations at the 2014 Asian Games
2014